Ronald E. Usher (born September 28, 1938) is an American politician from Maine who served 11 terms in the Maine Legislature between 1975 and 2004.

Early life and education 
Usher was born and raised in Westbrook and graduated from Westbrook High School in 1957. From 1957 to 1959, he served in the United States Navy. After leaving the Navy, he studied at what is now the University of Southern Maine from 1960 to 1962.

Career 
He worked as both a firefighter in the Westbrook Fire Department from 1962 to 1975 and as a papermaker at the S. D. Warren Paper Mill.

Usher represented Westbrook, Maine as a member of the Maine House of Representatives (1975–1976; 1997–2004) and the Maine Senate (1977–1988). Usher unsuccessfully sought election to the House of Representatives. He was defeated by Republican Donald Marean.

References

1938 births
Living people
Politicians from Westbrook, Maine
Westbrook High School (Maine) alumni
University of Southern Maine alumni
Military personnel from Maine
Democratic Party members of the Maine House of Representatives
Democratic Party Maine state senators
People from Buxton, Maine